César Alberto Castro Perez (born April 10, 1983 in Táchira), commonly known as César Castro, is a Venezuelan football defender who played in 2011-2012 season for Olympiakos Nicosia in Cyprus, where he spent most of the season on the sidelines injured and only managed to play once, without completing a full 90 minutes.

Club career
Castro started his professional career in Spain for FC L'Escala then moved to Greece in 2007 and played one season for Atromitos F.C., PAS Giannina F.C. and Panserraikos After his fullest season in Greece with his last club, playing 25 games, he moved to Cyprus, but was injured in pre-season. He then returned to Greece after Cyprus for 6 months for Vyzas F.C. before returning to his home country for Deportivo Lara in 2013-2014.

References

1983 births
Living people
Venezuelan footballers
Super League Greece players
Cypriot First Division players
Atromitos F.C. players
PAS Giannina F.C. players
Panserraikos F.C. players
Olympiakos Nicosia players
Vyzas F.C. players
Asociación Civil Deportivo Lara players
Venezuelan expatriate footballers
Expatriate footballers in Greece
Expatriate footballers in Cyprus
Association football defenders
Venezuelan expatriate sportspeople in Greece
Venezuelan expatriate sportspeople in Cyprus
People from San Cristóbal, Táchira